Chrome is an unincorporated community located within Carteret in Middlesex County, New Jersey, United States. The neighborhood's main street was once a bustling shopping district. The Chemical Coast rail line passes through the area.

References

Carteret, New Jersey
Unincorporated communities in Middlesex County, New Jersey
Unincorporated communities in New Jersey